Cloonacool is a village in County Sligo, Ireland. 
Cloonacool sits at the foot of the Ox Mountains, 15 km southeast of Coolaney along the Ballina road, and the intersection of the road to Tubbercurry. The confluence of the River Moy, the Mad River, and the River Berna are nearby. Cloonacool is both the local village's name and that of the townland surrounding the area.

Notable People
Seamus Burke

See also
 List of towns and villages in Ireland

References

External links
 Cloonacool Community

Towns and villages in County Sligo